HIV/AIDS Coordinating Committee (HACC) (គណៈកម្មការសំរបសំរួលប្រយុទ្ធនឹងជំងឺអេដស៍) is an HIV/AIDS Cambodian NGO network, representing over 120 NGOs working with HIV/AIDS in Cambodia. It was established in 1993 to coordinate civil society organizations and to promote the sharing of information, experiences, and advances from the field among civil society organizations in responding to HIV/AIDS in Cambodia.

Leadership
HACC is governed by a voluntary Steering Committee elected from and by the NGO members.
 Steering Committee (2011–2013)
 Kim Sokuntheary, Chair of the Steering Committee
 Phok Bunroeun, Vice-Chair of the Steering Committee
 Prang Chanthy, Treasurer of the Steering Committee
 Chhun Roeurn, Member
 Penh Sakun, Member
 Sem Peng Sean, Member
 Sok Pun, Member
 Steering Committee (2010–2011)
 Pon Yut Sakara, Chair of Steering Committee
 Long Leng, Vice Chair of the Steering Committee
 Sum Satum, Treasurer
 Sok Pun, Member
 Phok Bunroeun, Member
 Buth Saman, Member
 Srey Vanthuon, Member
 Executive Director
 Tim Vora, Executive Director of HACC

How HACC works
HACC provides opportunities for networking among members and other civil society networks to encourage policy change and protection for people living with HIV/AIDS and in the development of prevention measures. The organization works closely to make changes with the Government, international donors, and the UN. Specifically, it works by:
 Collaborating with members to coordinate the NGO response to HIV and AIDS at the national and provincial levels.
 Promoting communication and the sharing of information among members and between all those involved in the HIV and AIDS response in Cambodia and internationally.
 Raising awareness of HIV and AIDS and gaps in service delivery of HIV/AIDS treatment and preventative measures.
 Representing NGOs responding to HIV and AIDS at national and international forums where they have received a mandate from their members to do so.
 Advocating for the full involvement of civil society in determining policy, setting national targets, developing plans, and monitoring progress related to HIV and AIDS response on a national level.

The main policy focus for HACC and other members working in the area of an HIV/AIDS epidemic, is the issue of youth as a most at-risk people (MARP), along with Orphan Orphans and Vulnerable Children (OVCs), Injecting Drug User/Drug Users (IDU/DU), and Entertaining Workers (EW), and Prisoners, which were defined as those who are practicing high-risk behavior. In the National Strategic Plan III (NSPIII) 2011–2015, HACC played an important role in coordinating and facilitating the participation of civil societies in the process of planning and the launching the NSPIII 2011–2015., Water Festival Day and World AIDS Day in coordination with the National Aids Authority.

Roles
Networking: HACC provides networking opportunities for members, networks representing community interests, government, international donors, and United Nations agencies via its meetings, technical working groups, and information-sharing channels.

Coordination: HACC coordinates civil society responses to HIV and AIDS at national and provincial levels to ensure all CSO stakeholders can have meaningful input into major national reports, strategies, and review processes. 

Information sharing: HACC promotes communication and the sharing of information among members and stakeholders in Cambodia and internationally via its website, e-news alert, civil society directories, reports and meetings. ADVOCACY: HACC advocates for the full involvement of civil society in determining policy, setting national targets, developing plans, and monitoring progress in relation to HIV and AIDS.

Representation: HACC represents NGOs responding to HIV and AIDS at national and international forums where they have received a mandate from their members to do so.

Awareness raising: HACC works to raise public and government awareness of HIV/AIDS issues and gaps in the response via lobbying, regular media appearances, and staging awareness-raising campaigns during major national festivals such as the Water Festival.

References

HIV/AIDS in Cambodia
Medical and health organisations based in Cambodia